Here Where There Is Love is Dionne Warwick's sixth studio album for Scepter Records, and was released on December 4, 1966. The album was recorded at Bell Sound Studios in New York City and was produced in full by Burt Bacharach and Hal David with Bacharach also arranging and conducting.

History
It was Warwick's first Scepter album to make the top 40, climbing to No. 18 on  Billboard's Top LP's chart, and also her first album to be RIAA-certified gold in America, signifying sales of more than 500,000 copies.  It also hit No. 1 on Billboard'''s R&B albums chart.  The album's cover art features a photograph of a sunset with two anonymous lovers on a beach.

Two of Warwick's hit singles from 1966 were included on the album: her top 20 covers of Bacharach and David's "Trains and Boats and Planes" and "I Just Don't Know What to Do with Myself". Warwick's version of "Alfie", which she performed at the 1967 Academy Awards, became a bigger top 40 hit than any of the 40-plus versions that had previously been recorded, peaking at No. 15 on the Billboard Hot 100 singles chart in the summer of 1967 during a 17-week chart run. It also reached No. 5 on Billboard's R&B singles chart.

Other songs of note are the Bacharach and David-penned title track; Warwick's reading of "What The World Needs Now Is Love"; Charles Trenet's "I Wish You Love"; and a cover of Bob Dylan's "Blowin' in the Wind".

Track listing

See also
List of Billboard number-one R&B albums of the 1960s

References

External linksHere Where There Is Love'' at Discogs

Dionne Warwick albums
1966 albums
Albums arranged by Burt Bacharach
Albums produced by Burt Bacharach
Albums produced by Hal David
Scepter Records albums